The Sawback Range is a mountain range of the Canadian Rockies that stretches from the Bow Valley in Alberta into southeastern Banff National Park.

Mountains
This range includes the following mountains and peaks:

See also 
 Ranges of the Canadian Rockies

References

Ranges of the Canadian Rockies
Mountain ranges of Alberta
Mountains of Banff National Park